is a 2008 Japanese sports action comedy film inspired by the Stephen Chow's film Shaolin Soccer (2001). Unlike the original film, the movie focuses on women's lacrosse. It starred Japanese actress Ko Shibasaki and Hong Kong actors Lam Chi Chung and Tin Kai Man return from the original film. The film was released in Japan on April 26, 2008. Stephen Chow, director and star in Shaolin Soccer, was the producer, but is not credited as writer or director.

Plot
The film focuses on young Rin Sakurazawa, who, after having trained at the Shaolin Temple for 3000 days, returns to Japan to find her former dojo abandoned, and her former Shaolin master a cook at a local restaurant. Soon she is introduced to the fictional Seikan International University's Lacrosse Team. Meanwhile, the president of Seikan University, Yuichiro Oba, seems to be following a sinister objective.

Cast
 Ko Shibasaki  as Rin
 Toru Nakamura 
 Kitty Zhang Yuqi 
 Tin Kai Man  
 Lam Chi Chung 
 Takashi Okamura 
 Yōsuke Eguchi
 Naoko Watanabe
 Miyuu Sawai
 Masanori Ishii as Electronics Store Owner

Reception
This film received lukewarm reviews.

See also 
 University of Shizuoka

References

External links 
 

2008 films
2000s action comedy films
2000s sports comedy films
Japanese martial arts comedy films
2000s martial arts comedy films
Films directed by Katsuyuki Motohiro
Women's lacrosse
Japanese sports comedy films
2008 martial arts films
Shaolin Temple in film
2008 comedy films
2000s Japanese films